Pasites is a genus of bees belonging to the family Apidae.

The species of this genus are found in Europe, Western Asia and Africa.

Species:

Pasites appletoni 
Pasites barkeri 
Pasites bicolor 
Pasites braunsi 
Pasites carnifex 
Pasites curiosus 
Pasites dichrous 
Pasites dimidiata 
Pasites esakii 
Pasites friesei 
Pasites gnomus 
Pasites histrio 
Pasites humectus 
Pasites jenseni 
Pasites jonesi 
Pasites maculates
Pasites maculatus 
Pasites namibiensis 
Pasites nilssoni 
Pasites paulyi 
Pasites rufipes 
Pasites somalicus 
Pasites tegularis

References

Apidae